Eokrefftia is an extinct genus of prehistoric ray-finned fish that lived during the Paleocene epoch.

References

Paleocene fish
Myctophiformes
Prehistoric fish of Australia